Chris or Christopher Wilkinson may refer to:

Christopher Wilkinson (MP), member of parliament for Clitheroe, England, in 1689
Christopher Wilkinson (swimmer) (born 1943), British swimmer
Chris Wilkinson (architect) (1945–2021), British architect
Christopher Wilkinson (born 1950), American screenwriter and producer
Chris Wilkinson (born 1970), British tennis player